ISRA International Journal of Islamic Finance (IIJIF) is a reputable academic journal dedicated to publish high quality research in all the relevant fields of Islamic economics and finance. It is published by the International Shari’ah Research Academy for Islamic Finance (ISRA), which has been vested the task to promote applied Shari’ah research in the niche area of Islamic finance. As part of its fervent devotion to Islamic finance, the publication of IIJIF is yet another endeavor of ISRA to further the excellence in leading scholastic as well as practical research. 

IIJIF has been published since December 2009. It is a fully peer reviewed and refereed journal, aiming at a wider readership interested to learn more about Islamic economics, finance and other relevant disciplines. It aspires to publish original and unpublished work within the areas of, but not limited to, Sharia (Islamic law), Islamic economics, banking, capital markets, takaful (Islamic Insurance), etc. 

IIJIF considers the research with academic rigour as a fuelling-factor for the development and growth of the Islamic finance industry. This consideration is reflected in the IIJIF’s section of ‘Academic Articles’. However, beside academic research, IIJIF also appreciates the significance of hands-on experience of the Islamic finance industry professionals and is keen to offer them an opportunity to share their ideas and views through its dedicated section of ‘Practitioners’ Article’. This section is devoted to publish the articles that are written by various industry players. In this way, each issue of IIJIF represents a fine blend of research from both academic and practical aspects. Moreover, it also introduces research work which is currently carried on by Islamic finance researchers in the section titled ‘Research Notes’. 

IIJIF is published semi-annually (in June and December) in both printed and electronic forms. Each issue of IIJIF consists of 4 academic articles, 1 practitioners’ article and 5 research notes. 

IIJIF has set high standards of publication ethics since its inception and has been observing the policy of ‘no compromise’ on ethics in publication. It conscientiously encourages integrity in research publication. 

IIJIF enjoys the privilege of having a highly reputable International Editorial Advisory Board comprising renowned Shari’ah scholars and distinguished academics. It greatly benefits from those esteemed members in terms of their vast knowledge and experience. Those members contribute in IIJIF by refereeing the submitted articles; offering advice to the Editorial Committee; and contributing articles to IIJIF.

Publication Details 
Journal Name: ISRA International Journal of Islamic Finance (IIJIF)
 Publisher: International Shari’ah Research Academy for Islamic Finance (ISRA)
 Copyright: International Shari’ah Research Academy for Islamic Finance (ISRA)
 Frequency of issuance: Semi-annual (in June and December)
 Inaugural Issue: December 2009
 Language: English
 Content: Academic Articles, Practitioner’s Article and Research Notes
 Print-ISSN 0128-1976
 Electronic-ISSN 2289-4365

International Databases 
ISRA International Journal of Islamic Finance is indexed in:
 EBSCO Products
 EconLit
 EconBiz
 Index Islamicus
 ProQuest
 Scientific Indexing Services

Islamic economic jurisprudence
Islamic banking
Sharia
Research